The Ministry of the Revolutionary Armed Forces of Cuba ( – MINFAR), also known as the Ministry of the FAR, is a Cuban military agency which is the executive body of the Cuban Revolutionary Armed Forces. The current Minister of the FAR is Corps General and longtime Chief of Staff Álvaro López Miera.

Leadership structure
 First Secretary – Miguel Díaz-Canel
 Commander in Chief – Miguel Díaz-Canel
 Minister of the FAR – Álvaro López Miera
 Chief of Staff – Álvaro López Miera

Responsibilities
The MINFAR directs, controls, and executes the policy of the Communist Party of Cuba and the government regarding the activities of the readiness of the nation to defend itself. It is responsible for the budget of the military, as well as for making arms deals with other countries. This ministry fulfills these obligations in coordination with other government agencies and institutions. The powers and functions of the MINFAR are regulated in legislation from the National Assembly of People's Power.

Ministers
† denotes people who died in office.

See also

Council of Ministers of Cuba
Intelligence Directorate (G2)
Military Counterintelligence Directorate
Ministry of Foreign Affairs (MINREX)
Ministry of Science, Technology and Environment (CITMA)
Ministry of the Interior (MININT)

Sources

Military of Cuba
Government ministries of Cuba
Ministries established in 1959
1959 establishments in Cuba